Madness is the eighth studio album by American metal band All That Remains. It was released on April 28, 2017, on Razor & Tie Records. Madness is the first studio album produced by Howard Benson, as well as the first album to feature bassist Aaron Patrick. While this is the band's next-to-last album with guitarist Oli Herbert, it is also their last album to be released in his lifetime.

Background
Vocalist Phil Labonte told Revolver magazine about band's approach on the new disc: "We wanted to mix it up a little bit and write from a vocal perspective this time. So I went to L.A. and came up with vocal ideas and melodies and then sent those chord progressions back to Oli Herbert and he wrote riffs in response to that. Doing it this way turned the record into a vocal album as opposed to a guitar album. And that affected some things. Like, there might be less intricacy in the riffs because they were written in response to my voice."

Musical style
Labonte added that the majority of the new songs features "significant programming and electronic sounds. And that's something we wanted to have flowing through the entire record. So you're gonna hear that kind of influence on most of the tracks."

Phil also stated: "On this record, there's five songs on the record that are exactly what you would expect from All That Remains. There's some songs where we kind of were, like, 'All right, let's push this and maybe change what we can do, or what All That Remains is allowed to do.' But it ain't like we're not heavy anymore. And if you're just, like, 'Oh, they're not heavy anymore,' then you're just not listening."

Reception

The album received mixed reviews. Aaron J. Marko of Exclaim! described the album as mediocre, generic and archaic. Christopher Di Carlo of Overdrive magazine, on the other hand, described the album as beautiful yet heavy.

Track listing
All lyrics written by Phil Labonte; all music composed by All That Remains.

Personnel

All That Remains
 Philip Labonte – lead vocals, art direction, cover design
 Oli Herbert – lead guitar
 Mike Martin – rhythm guitar
 Aaron Patrick – bass guitar, backing vocals
 Jason Costa – drums

Additional musicians
Mark Sereikas - additional guitar on "Thunder Rolls"
Benny Goodman - piano/keyboards and additional engineering/production on Thunder Rolls at Speak EZ Studios, Randolph, MA
Cory Paza - bass and additional engineering/production on Thunder rolls at Speak EZ Studios, Randolph, MA

Freedom Chorus
Diamante (also does additional vocals on "Thunder Rolls")
Meron Ryan
Sidnie Tipton
Lenny Skolnik
Seann Bowe

Production
 Howard Benson – production, mixing
 Mike Plotnikoff – co-production, engineering
 Hatsukazu "Hatch" Inagaki – engineering
 Shaun Ezrol and Carl Stoodt – assistant engineering
 Bob Ludwig – mastering 
 Lenny Skolnik, Seann Bowe, Howard Benson – keyboards and programming
 Marc VanGool – guitar tech
 Jon Nicholson at Drum Fetish – drum tech
 Joe Rickard – pre-production, drum programming
 Igor Khoroshev – string arrangement on "Back to You"
 Paul DeCarli – digital editing
 Nick Haussling – A&R
 Tom Gnolfo – A&R administration
 Diamante Azzura – backing vocals
 Josh Strock – composition

Charts

References

2017 albums
All That Remains (band) albums
Razor & Tie albums
Albums produced by Howard Benson
Alternative metal albums by American artists